For information about this ship's class, see Claud Jones-class destroyer escort

USS Claud Jones (DE-1033) was launched 27 May 1958 by Avondale Marine Ways, Avondale, Louisiana, sponsored by Mrs. M. R. J. Wyllie; and commissioned 10 February 1959, Lieutenant Commander W. M. Cone in command. The ship was named for Claud Ashton Jones.

After training at Guantanamo Bay, Cuba, Claud Jones cruised to northern Europe between June and August 1959, returning to Key West, Florida, her home port. During 1960, she operated along the east coast and in the Caribbean, with a voyage to northern European waters during NATO exercises in September and October.

References

 

Claud Jones-class destroyer escorts
Ships built in Bridge City, Louisiana
1958 ships